Oru Vidukadhai Oru Thodarkadhai is a 1979 Indian Tamil-language film directed by M. A. Kaja. The film was remade in Malayalam as Oru Thira Pinneyum Thira.

Plot 
Thyagarajan and Kamala are in love but are separated due to unforeseen events in their lives. Kamala has moved to New Delhi and is married off to a philandering husband who has no affection for her.

Years later, Thyagarajan joins an office in a managing role and to his surprise finds Kamala works under him. As time rolls Kamala learns that Thyagarajan's wife, a sports fan, has deserted him for his close friend Bhaskar, a basketball player.

The erstwhile lovers unhappy in their personal lives become supportive of each other. The rest of the story unveils does Kamala and Thyagarajan find happiness in their life or remain unhappy.

Cast 

 Vijayan
 Shoba
 Vijay Babu
 Aparna
 Master Sekhar
 Suruli Rajan
 Meera

Soundtrack 
The soundtrack was composed by Gangai Amaran making his debut as composer with this film. Amaran revealed his debut film as composer Malargalile Oru Malligai became unreleased despite soundtrack being released so Oru Vidukathai Oru Thodarkathai became his first film as composer to be released. All songs were written by Vaali and Gangai Amaran. The songs "Nayagan Avan Puram" and "Vidukathai Ondru" became hugely popular.

Reception 
Kausikan of Kalki gave a negative review citing director Kaja's audacity is frowned upon and he should not continue with this kind of stories.

References

External links 
 

1970s Tamil-language films
1979 drama films
1979 films
Films scored by Gangai Amaran
Indian drama films
Tamil films remade in other languages